A dungeon monitor, sometimes referred to as a dungeon master or simply DM, is a person charged with supervising a playspace (or "dungeon") at BDSM events such as play parties and fetish clubs. A dungeon monitor may be of any sex or gender, and may normally identify as any role (dominant, submissive, or switch). On duty, their authority is absolute. If a Dungeon Monitor orders a play scene to stop, it must be stopped immediately. Dungeon Monitors are usually people with significant experience and/or explicit education in BDSM and safer sex practices, and who also have verifiable training both in BDSM safety practices and first aid techniques. They often wear a special uniform, hat or armband, but there is no standard for determining who is a Dungeon Monitor.

The primary responsibility of a Dungeon Monitor is to ensure the physical safety of all participants engaging in BDSM play. In most cases, there is a team of Dungeon Monitors, led by one or more Chief Dungeon Monitors. At private parties, it is typically the host's role to act as a Chief Dungeon Monitor or to nominate an attendee to serve in that capacity, possibly along with one or more additional Dungeon Monitors. At public playspaces, the venue typically appoints volunteers or employees for the same purpose.

Almost all playspaces define a set of house rules that list the prohibited activities as well as the default safeword and sometimes even a safe gesture. In addition to monitoring play scenes and enforcing the house rules, Dungeon Monitors also maintain the dungeon equipment between scenes (if the players themselves fail to do so), performing such activities as making players clean surfaces and equipment after use (usually with disinfectants), replacing pads, and generally readying a play area safely for its next scene.

See also
 List of BDSM terms

BDSM terminology